The 2005 Pilot Pen Tennis was a tennis tournament played on outdoor hard courts. It was the 21st edition of the Pilot Pen Tennis, and is part of the International Series of the 2005 ATP Tour, and of the Tier II Series of the 2005 WTA Tour. It took place at the Cullman-Heyman Tennis Center in New Haven, Connecticut, United States, from August 21 through August 27, 2005.

Finals

Men's singles

 James Blake defeated  Feliciano López 3–6, 7–5, 6–1
 It was Blake's 1st title of the year and the 2nd of his career.

Women's singles

 Lindsay Davenport defeated  Amélie Mauresmo 6–4, 6–4
 It was Davenport's 3rd title of the year and the 48th of her career.

Men's doubles

 Gastón Etlis /  Martín Rodríguez defeated  Rajeev Ram /  Bobby Reynolds 6–4, 6–3
 It was Etlis's 1st title of the year and the 4th of his career. It was Rodríguez's 1st title of the year and the 5th of his career.

Women's doubles

 Lisa Raymond /  Samantha Stosur defeated  Gisela Dulko /  Maria Kirilenko 6–2, 6–7(6–8), 6–1
 It was Raymond's 2nd title of the year and the 46th of her career. It was Stosur's 3rd title of the year and the 3rd of her career.

References

External links

Pilot Pen Tennis
Pilot Pen Tennis
2005
Pilot Pen Tennis
Pilot Pen Tennis
Pilot Pen Tennis
Pilot Pen Tennis
2005 Pilot Pen Tennis